Johnson Square is one of the 22 squares of Savannah, Georgia, United States. Located in the northernmost row of the city's five rows of squares, it was the first of the squares to be laid out, in 1733, and remains the largest of the 22. It is east of Ellis Square, west of Reynolds Square and north of Wright Square. Situated on Bull Street and St. Julian Street, it is named for Robert Johnson, colonial governor of South Carolina and a friend of General James Oglethorpe. The oldest building on the square is the Ann Hamilton House, at 26 East Bryan Street, which dates to 1824.

Interred under his monument in the square is Revolutionary War hero General Nathanael Greene, the namesake of nearby Greene Square. Greene died in 1786 and was buried in Savannah's Colonial Park Cemetery. His son was buried beside him after drowning in the Savannah River in 1793. Following vandalism of the cemetery by occupying Union forces during the Civil War the location of Greene's burial was lost. After the remains were re-identified Greene and his son were moved to Johnson Square. An obelisk in the center of the square now serves as a memorial to General Greene. The cornerstone of the monument was laid by Gilbert du Motier, Marquis de Lafayette, in 1825. At that time the obelisk did not yet commemorate any specific individual or event. In fact, due to financial restrictions the unmarked obelisk served for several years as a joint monument to both Greene and Casimir Pulaski.  Inscriptions honoring Greene were added in 1886, but the Greenes’ physical remains did not arrive until 1901, following their "rediscovery."

Johnson Square contains two fountains, as well as a sundial.

Another landmark of Johnson Square is the Johnson Square Business Center. This building, formerly known as the Savannah Bank Building, was the city's first "skyscraper", built in 1911. Johnson Square is known as the financial district, or banking square, and many of the City's financial services companies are located here. These companies include the Savannah Bancorp, Savannah Bank, Coastal Bank Headquarters, Bank of America branch, SunTrust branch, TitleMax Corporate Headquarters, and a Regions Bank building.

Christ Church Episcopal occupies the southeastern trust lot of the square at 28 Bull Street. Christ Church is "the Mother Church of Georgia", established in 1733. Early clergy of the church include John Wesley and George Whitefield.

Markers and structures

Constituent buildings

Each building below is in one of the eight blocks around the square composed of four residential "tything" blocks and four civic ("trust") blocks, now known as the Oglethorpe Plan. They are listed with construction years where known.

Northwestern residential/tything block
10 Whitaker Street (1878)
18 West Bryan Street (1912)
John L. Hardee Property, 22–24 West Bryan Street (1878)

Southwestern trust/civic block
United Community Bank, 27 Bull Street (1912)

Northeastern residential/tything block
Johnson Square Business Center, 2 East Bryan Street (1911) – former Savannah Bank and Trust Building
Ann Hamilton House, 24–26 East Bryan Street (1824) – oldest building on the square
30–32 East Bryan Street (1916)
9 Drayton Street (1853)Savannah, Immortal City: Volume One of the Civil War Savannah Series, Barry Sheehy, Cindy Wallace, Vaughnette Goode-Walker (2011) 
Citizens Bank Building, 15 Drayton Street (1895) – now Propes Hall, part of SCAD

Northeastern trust/civic block
Bank of America, 22 Bull Street (1907) – former Citizens and Southern Bank

Southeastern trust/civic block
 Christ Church, 28 Bull Street (1838/1897)

Southeastern residential/tything block
The Manger Building, 7 East Congress Street (1913) – formerly the Hotel Savannah

Gallery

References

Johnson Square, Savannah
1733 establishments in the Thirteen Colonies